The LVG C.VIII was a prototype reconnaissance aircraft built in Germany during World War I.

Design and development
The C.VIII was a conventional two-bay biplane design of its day, with unstaggered wings of equal span and tandem, open cockpits for the pilot and observer.

Specifications

References

Further reading

1910s German military reconnaissance aircraft
C.VIII
Single-engined tractor aircraft
Biplanes
Aircraft first flown in 1918

de:LVG C.V-VIII